Rapistrum rugosum is a species of flowering plant in the mustard family known by the common names annual bastardcabbage, common giant mustard or turnipweed. It is native to Eurasia and parts of Africa, and it is present throughout the world as an introduced species and a common weed. It is an invasive species in many areas. It is an annual herb producing an erect stem reaching up to about a meter tall. The leaves are variable in shape and size and the proximal blades are generally cut into lobes or divided into leaflets. The herbage is coated in rough hairs. The inflorescence is a raceme of flowers with dark-veined yellow petals that are each under a centimeter long. The fruit is a knoblike spherical ribbed silique borne on a long pedicel with a widened area where it joins the fruit.

References

External links

Jepson Manual Treatment
Photo gallery

Brassicaceae
Flora of Malta